Sumner is a given name. Notable people with the name include:

Sumner Archibald Cunningham (1843-1913), American Confederate veteran and newspaper editor.
Sumner Chilton Powell, winner of the Pulitzer Prize for History in 1964
Sumner Gerard, American businessman and diplomat, US Ambassador to Jamaica
Sumner L. Trussell (1860–1931), judge of the United States Board of Tax Appeals
Sumner Paine, 1896 Olympic shooting gold and silver medalist
Sumner Redstone (or Sumner Murray Rothstein, 1923–2020), Chairman of Viacom
Sumner Stone, (born 1945), typeface designer
Sumner Welles, (1892–1961), U. S. Undersecretary of State